BBC Parliament is a British free-to-air public broadcast television channel from the BBC that broadcasts live and recorded coverage of the House of Commons, House of Lords and Select Committees of the British Parliament, the Scottish Parliament, the London Assembly, the Northern Ireland Assembly and the Welsh Senedd. As of January 2022, the channel had a typical weekly peak of approximately 120,000 viewers, during Prime Minister's Questions, representing a monthly reach of 5.41% of UK TV households and 0.06% overall share. When the channel is not broadcasting parliamentary content, it simulcasts the BBC News channel.

History 

In 1991, United Artists Programming initiated a trial project to provide highlights of debates from Parliament in a programme called Yesterday in the Commons to cable networks across the UK. The trial was deemed to be a success and this led to United Artists Cable launching The Parliamentary Channel on 13 January 1992. It provided live and recorded coverage of the British Parliament and also aired full live coverage of the September part conference season.

In 1998 the channel was purchased by the BBC and was relaunched on 23 September 1998 as BBC Parliament. It now broadcasts on cable, satellite, and Freeview. This followed the launch three yars earlier of a Digital Audio Broadcasting, from the Crystal Palace transmitting station, which had offered is a relay of events in Parliament.  This audio service became a relay of BBC Parliament when the channel launched, and continued until the DAB radio service was closed down on 14 November 2000.

Due to capacity limitations on the digital terrestrial television platform, now known as Freeview, from launch until 30 October 2002, the channel ran as "audio only". Then on Freeview from October 2002 until 13 November 2006 the channel was only able to broadcast a quarter-screen picture. After receiving "thousands of angry and perplexed emails and letters", not to mention questions asked by MPs in the House itself, the BBC eventually found the bandwidth to make the channel full-screen.

Until 2008, BBC Parliament was unique amongst the BBC channels in being broadcast using non-BBC facilities, with ITV's Millbank Studios in Westminster supplying the engineering and playout facilities. Production, editorial and journalism were, however, maintained by the BBC.

The previous idents, also based on a Big Ben clock motif ran from 2009 to 2016. This replaced the channel's previous identity which was first introduced in 2002.

BBC Parliament was taken off the air during the 2012 Summer Olympics on Freeview in post-digital switchover areas to enable BBC Three to broadcast 24 hours a day. The BBC had done the same during the 2008 Summer Olympics as it used the space to provide an additional BBC Red Button option for Freeview users.

BBC Parliament HD has been confirmed as launching from 20 October 2021 and rolling out across various platforms at different times right up to the end of 2022, the standard definition service will continue on Freeview. This has been the case since 10 December 2013 when BBC Three, BBC Four, BBC News, CBBC, and Cbeebies began high definition simulcasts.

On 5 September 2016 BBC Two began broadcasting BBC Parliament during BBC Two's overnight downtime. However this was short-lived and has subsequently been discontinued.

On 14 October 2016, the channel received a new look and new idents, its first revamp since 2009. The channel's current identity went live on Monday 10 October 2016 with refreshed music and idents based on clock workings, with colours and images derived from the flags and assemblies of the British home countries and the European Parliament.

In July 2018, the BBC announced that the output on the channel was to be cut back, discontinuing all programming produced for the channel other than parliamentary coverage, and closing the channel entirely during summer months when Parliament and the devolved assemblies are not sitting. The move has been criticised by many including the former House of Commons Speaker John Bercow. In October 2018, the BBC announced that it had shelved these plans.

From 26 July until 31 August 2021, BBC Parliament simulcast the BBC News Channel during a parliamentary recess. This was the first time the channel had done this – previously, BBC Parliament broadcast highlights from the previous session during recesses. This is part of a range of cutbacks to the channel which also sees the end of coverage of party conferences as well as the ending of The Day in Parliament and The Week in Parliament and to all other programming made for the channel. Coverage of the House of Lords and Select committees is also significantly reduced. Also, the Sunday broadcasts of national political shows, C-SPAN and a repeat of Question Time have stopped. Consequently, the channel now operates a 24-hour schedule consisting of nothing other than live and recorded coverage from Westminster and the devolved chambers. The rebroadcasting of the BBC News Channel has taken place during subsequent recesses and it appears as though this will now be the case during the summer, Christmas and Easter recesses.

In April 2022, BBC Parliament began broadcasting in high-definition, initially only on the Virgin Media platform, and was later made available on Sky and Freesat in February 2023. Following the death of Elizabeth II, the channel broadcast Queen Elizabeth's lying in state from 14 September 2022 for several days.

Programming

Regular programming 
Whenever the House of Commons is sitting, BBC Parliament carries the chamber live without interruption, with any simultaneous House of Lords sitting being shown in full later the same day and the following morning, often in sections that fit around the sittings of the Commons. The House of Lords is broadcast live only on days when there is no House of Commons sitting scheduled. BBC Parliament also provides full, recorded coverage of the House of Commons' second chamber Westminster Hall during weekends, when they will also broadcast selected evidence sessions from different select committees of the House of Commons.

Whenever both Westminster chambers are in recess, but a devolved assembly is constituted, the channel will provide live coverage of its work, while during Westminster sessions, coverage of the devolved assemblies usually takes the form of highlights at the weekend of the previous week's main debates and business.

Thus, when taken together with both live and recorded coverage from the other bodies it covers, BBC Parliament's schedule is dominated by direct broadcasts of the legislative and political institutions, whether they be plenary, quasi-plenary (such as Westminster Hall), or in committees that affect British public life.

Election night 
In the event of one of the devolved nations producing their own results programme on election night, normally the first Thursday in May, BBC Parliament will usually broadcast this telecast to the whole of the United Kingdom. On election night for the 2005, 2010, 2015 and 2017 general elections, BBC Parliament aired BBC Scotland's result night coverage.  A few days afterwards, it would also broadcast a replay of election night coverage from BBC Wales and BBC Northern Ireland. It also took BBC Scotland's coverage of both the 2011 devolved assembly elections and Scottish Independence Referendum.  In March 2011 BBC Parliament simulcast BBC Wales's results coverage of the nation's devolution referendum.

Original Programmes 
Until July 2021, BBC Parliament had often broadcast its own original programmes. They were either be scheduled or used to fill any gaps in the billed programmes, especially when live coverage of a legislative chamber ends before the next programme is due to start. The programmes covered a variety of political and parliamentary subjects, including:

A to Z of Westminster – A series of short programmes presented by BBC Parliament researchers that seek to explain some of the more common aspects of parliamentary protocol.
Britain's Best Buildings – Only the episode that features the Palace of Westminster is broadcast, usually edited down into short segments that focus on one specific feature of the palace.
Election File – Short summaries of previous general election results, including short bursts of the BBC's original television coverage. These files are now rarely shown.
In House – A new strand of programmes that replaced A-Z of Westminster in 2011. The programmes are similar in function to their predecessor series, seeking to explain some of the strange procedures that occur in Parliament.
Laying Down the Law – A standalone programme that explains the parliamentary stages a bill must go through to become an Act of Parliament.
MP Too! – A series of short programmes that look back at some eighteenth and nineteenth centuries Members of Parliament (MPs) who were more famous for their work outside of the House of Commons or House of Lords.
Village Idioms – Short examinations of modern-day idioms that were coined in Westminster, including 'reading the Riot Act' and 'flogging a dead horse'.
 Laws and Ladies – A topical chat show, featuring a panel of peers discussing the political issues of the day. Those appearing are Baroness Boothroyd, Baroness Knight of Collingtree and Baroness Dean of Thornton-le-Fylde.

Archive and special programming

General election and referendum repeats 
Between 2002 and 2020, the channel frequently showed recordings of BBC general election coverage, from the 1955 election, the first British election programme to be telerecorded as well as other events such as the 1975 EEC Referendum and the 2016 EU Referendum. Some have been broadcast on the anniversary of their original transmissions. The channel's editor has described this as adding "something of value" and says it helps the channel "reach a wider audience for our normal parliamentary schedule".

1 – Only three hours of the programme is known to exist. 
2 – This was given a special introduction by David Dimbleby, the son of Richard Dimbleby who presented the 1959 broadcast. Only the overnight footage was shown because the daytime coverage was not kept. 
3 – Only two hours of coverage is known to exist with the surviving coverage originally broadcast in mid-afternoon. 
4 – In addition, the overnight coverage of the 1979 election was broadcast on BBC Four on 12 June 2008.
5 – The 1983 coverage was originally scheduled to be shown on 10 October 2003, but was not broadcast.
6 _ The 1987 coverage was originally scheduled to be shown on 10 June 2017 for the 30th anniversary which was the following day 11 June but due to the 2017 General Election having taken place 2 days earlier the planned showing was cancelled and replaced by the re-run of Election 2017
7 – The 1997 coverage was originally scheduled to be shown on 1 May 2017 to coincide with its 20th anniversary but due to the surprise calling of the 2017 general election scheduled for 8 June it was postponed and eventually shown on 4 September 2017. 
8 –  The 1997 coverage is broadcast "clean"- without the original on-screen graphics, although they have been included on all other election reruns.

Special programming 
From 2002 until 2019 BBC Parliament frequently broadcast programmes that have a historical or broader social significance, often encompassing major events both in the United Kingdom and in the world. They have also included a selection of programmes exploring issues of import and topicality in-depth, akin to BBC Four. They are generally shown on the anniversaries of major events. Programmes in this area have been diverse in character, such as the channel's first archive rerun, which was to celebrate the Golden Jubilee in June 2002 when BBC Parliament reran the coronation coverage. All special programming ended in 2020 due to cutbacks at the channel which saw it revert to schedule which only featured live and delayed coverage of the UK's Parliamentary bodies.

2005–2006 
In 2005, the channel marked the 40th anniversary of the death of Winston Churchill by broadcasting archive coverage of his funeral.

Also in 2005, BBC Parliament also marked the 30th anniversary of the first referendum over Europe by reshowing interviews with the two main party leaders, and broadcasting the two hours of the Referendum results coverage which the BBC retains in its archives.

The 50th anniversary of the Suez Crisis was commemorated in November 2006, with writer and broadcaster Anthony Howard introducing a special series of programmes on the channel. This included television broadcasts by the then-prime minister Anthony Eden and the then-Labour Leader of the Opposition Hugh Gaitskell, alongside a new documentary called Suez in Parliament: a Fine Hullabaloo.

2007–2008 
On 1 April 2007, veteran BBC correspondent Brian Hanrahan introduced Falklands Night to mark the 25th anniversary of the outbreak of the Falklands War. Programming included the BBC's original television news bulletins and reports from the period, alongside editions of Newsnight and excerpts of debates from Question Time. Falklands Night was shown twice during the spring of 2007 to mark the beginning and the end of the conflict.

On 1 July 2007, the channel broadcast Hong Kong Night, presented by Chris Patten, the last Governor of Hong Kong, which reran coverage of the handover ceremony, to coincide with the tenth anniversary of the end of British rule, and the transfer of sovereignty over Hong Kong to China.

The tenth anniversary of the death of Diana, Princess of Wales was marked on 1 September 2007 with a broadcast of the BBC coverage of her funeral. The rerun was shown at the precise broadcast times of the BBC's original coverage, running from 8:25 am until 4:00 pm. David Dimbleby, who anchored the BBC's coverage, said a few words at the beginning and end of the rerun.

Cliff Michelmore came out of retirement on 18 November 2007 to present The Pound in Your Pocket, a special strand of programming to mark forty years since the devaluation of the Pound by the British government on 18 November 1967. Editions of The Money Programme and 24 Hours were shown along with highlights from the 1968 Budget programme and ministerial broadcasts. The strand's title was taken from the famously misquoted television broadcast made by the then-prime minister Harold Wilson about the devaluation on 19 November 1967. Wilson said: "It does not mean that the pound here in Britain, in your pocket, in your purse or bank has been devalued."

On 26 May 2008, Joan Bakewell introduced an archive evening called Permissive Night which examined the liberalising social reform legislation passed by Parliament in the late 1960s. Topics covered included changes to divorce law, the death penalty, the Abortion Act 1967, the Race Relations Act 1968, the partial decriminalisation of homosexual acts (using editions of the documentary series Man Alive) and the relaxation of censorship. The evening concluded with a special new edition of Late Night Line-Up, the review programme that Joan Bakewell presented in the late 1960s.

On 30 November 2008, BBC Parliament broadcast the 1958 State Opening of Parliament to mark 50 years since the event was first televised.

2009 
The fall of James Callaghan's Labour government was marked on its 30th anniversary – 28 March 2009. Donald MacCormick, making what would prove to be his final television appearance before his death, presented The Night The Government Fell, which included nearly three-and-a-half hours of audio highlights of the Commons debate that resulted in Callaghan's government losing a vote of no confidence by 311 votes to 310. A documentary charting the evening's events was shown, as was McCormick's own live programme from Westminster on the night of the vote.

On 28 June 2009, BBC Parliament reran BBC TV's coverage of the 1969 Investiture of Prince Charles as Prince of Wales to mark the 40th anniversary of this event. The channel also re-broadcast an interview which Prince Charles gave a few days before his Investiture.

The anniversary of the BBC's own Question Time series was marked on 25 September 2009 by re-broadcasting the first edition of the topical discussion programme from 30 years earlier. Robin Day presented alongside the inaugural panel of Michael Foot MP, Teddy Taylor, Edna O'Brien and Archbishop Derek Worlock.

The writer and broadcaster Anthony Howard presented an archive evening on 10 October 2009 entitled Never Had It So Good, that looked back on 1959. This included television election broadcasts by the prime minister Harold Macmillan, Leader of the Opposition Hugh Gaitskell and Labour's Tony Benn; an edition of Tonight; and other BBC current affairs programmes. The evening's title is taken from a phrase contained in a speech made by Harold Macmillan in 1957 when he optimistically said, "Let us be frank about it – most of our people have never had it so good".

2011 
At the 2011 Irish general election, BBC Parliament simulcast Irish state broadcaster RTÉ's general election results programme on 26 February 2011. The election saw the incumbent Irish government fall to heavy defeat at the hands of the other parties. The channel also broadcast recorded coverage of the presentation of the Irish government's 2012 budget in the Dáil Éireann in December 2011.

2013 
On Thursday 14 February, BBC Parliament broadcast an evening of selected archive programmes under the title Harold Wilson Night. Presented by Peter Snow, the five-hour block of programming marked the 50th anniversary of the election of Harold Wilson as leader of the Labour Party on 14 February 1963, the longest serving and most electorally successful Labour prime minister of the 20th century. The sequence of programmes, which included Harold Wilson's famous "Pound in your Pocket" broadcast and the first airing of the once controversial Yesterday's Men documentary since its initial broadcast in June 1971, was repeated two days later.

On Monday 18 March, BBC Parliament showed four hours of the House of Commons debate about whether to commit British troops to the invasion of Iraq. Titled Iraq – Ten Years On, it was shown to mark the tenth anniversary of the debate.

On Monday 8 April, BBC Parliament broadcast an evening of archive programming to mark the death of Margaret Thatcher, the first female to serve as prime minister. The schedule included three interviews conducted by Sir Robin Day, Mrs Thatcher's speeches to the 1980 and 1984 Conservative Party Conferences, her last speech in the House of Commons in November 1990 and her maiden speech in the House of Lords in 1992.

On the 60th anniversary of the Coronation of Queen Elizabeth II (2 June), the channel showed BBC Television's original coverage of the event. The footage was shown "as live" and included the State Procession which followed the Coronation service.

On Sunday 9 June, BBC Parliament broadcast Beeching Night to mark the 50th anniversary of The Beeching Report on the future of Britain's railways, which recommended closing 3,000 miles of track and 2,000 stations to help stem massive losses. The evening was presented by Nicholas Owen. The strand featured railway-themed editions of various BBC current affairs programmes, including two editions of Panorama, as well as news reports and two interviews with Dr Beeching. Also included was a new programme looking at the relationship between the railways and politicians.

On Saturday 19 October, BBC Parliament marked the 50th anniversary of the appointment of Alec Douglas-Home as prime minister following the resignation of Harold Macmillan. Titled Home at the Top the sequence included the edition of Panorama broadcast on the night of the hand-over and an address to the nation by the new prime minister.

2014 
Following the death of Tony Benn on 14 March 2014, BBC Parliament broadcast a special evening of programming which included his 1959 Labour Party election broadcast from the General Election campaign; Mr Benn's 1990 House of Commons speech from the vote of confidence debate on Prime Minister Margaret Thatcher; his final speech in Parliament in 2001; his 1995 documentary Behind Closed Doors which took viewers behind the scenes in Parliament; and Labour MP Tristan Hunt's 2011 Speaker's lecture on the career of Tony Benn.

2015 
To mark the 50th anniversary of the funeral of Winston Churchill, BBC Parliament replayed the black-and-white funeral coverage, commentated by Richard Dimbleby, and at the same time as the original broadcast. The broadcast was introduced by Nicholas Soames, Churchill's grandson, who was in attendance that day.

On Sunday 26 July, BBC Parliament showed an evening of programmes to mark the 50th anniversary of Ted Heath becoming the leader of the Conservative Party.

On Saturday 28 November, BBC Parliament broadcast Tebbit on Thatcher, an evening of programmes to mark the 25th anniversary of Margaret Thatcher's resignation as prime minister and leader the Conservative Party. The programmes were introduced by Norman Tebbit and the items shown included her 1980 speech to the Conservative Party Conference, news reports about vital events in her time as prime minister and two editions of Panorama.

2016 
On 3 April, BBC Parliament broadcast Callaghan Night to mark the 40th anniversary of James Callaghan replacing Harold Wilson as prime minister and leader of the Labour Party.  Three editions of Panorama and two editions of Tonight were shown, which covered significant moments of Mr Callaghan's time as prime minister, including the UK's financial bailout by the IMF, the 1977 Lib-Lab pact and the result of the 1979 vote of no confidence against the government of James Callaghan which signalled the end of the Labour Government.

On 5 June to mark both the 41st anniversary of the 1975 EEC Referendum in the run-up to the 2016 EU Referendum the channel broadcast a night of current and archive programmes under the banner of "75: Not Out." The opening programme (of the same name) was presented by Angela Rippon and featured the "1975 Oxford Union Debate" in two parts, a 1975 Panorama EEC debate which was presented by a young David Dimbleby, BBC news clips, the original 1975 EEC Referendum party political broadcasts and the surviving results programme.

2017 
On 12 May, to mark the 80th anniversary of the coronation of King George VI, BBC Parliament showed Pathe's original coverage of the coronation and Pathe's colour film of the coronation processions to and from Westminster Abbey. In addition, the channel showed a brief programme looking at BBC Television's coverage of the day.

2019 
On 3 June 2019, BBC Parliament showed the BBC's coverage of the results of the 2016 United States presidential election which saw Donald Trump elected as President of the United States. The coverage was timed to coincide with his state visit to Britain. This is the first time that BBC Parliament has shown a rerun of the BBC's coverage of an American election.

On 1 July 2019, BBC Parliament reran BBC TV's coverage of the 1969 Investiture of Prince Charles as Prince of Wales to mark the 50th anniversary of the event.

Former programming 
Until 2021, BBC Parliament had broadcast a range of political and current affairs programmes from across the BBC, including:

 BOOKtalk – face-to-face discussion with authors about recently released political books, presented by Mark D'Arcy. A summer special is also produced featuring several 'beach books'.
 Briefings – a strand of programmes, usually broadcast weekend evenings, containing recorded coverage of major press briefings and conferences given by politicians in the previous week.
 Dateline London – a roundtable panel of foreign correspondents in London discussing the week's news. Dateline is now only shown on the BBC News Channel and on BBC World News.
 Dragon's Eye (produced by BBC Wales) – presented by Adrian Masters or Rhun ap Iorwerth, providing a weekly roundup of Welsh political developments (since replaced by the Welsh section of Sunday Politics).
 Eòrpa (produced by BBC Gàidhlig) – current affairs series which covers political and social developments covering Europe, transmitted in Gaelic with English subtitles.
 Hearts and Minds (produced by BBC Northern Ireland) – weekly programme covering the latest issues in the politics of Northern Ireland (since replaced by the Northern Irish section of Sunday Politics).
Lords Questions – recorded coverage of the most recent session of Questions in the House of Lords.
 Mayor's Question Time – recorded coverage of the monthly question period in the London Assembly to the Mayor of London.
Politics Europe – monthly programme usually broadcast on a Friday which covers the latest political news across Europe, analysing both the situation in Brussels as well as within individual European nations. Filmed in exactly the same format as the Daily Politics, presented by Andrew Neil or Jo Coburn. Also broadcast on BBC World News.
 Politics Live – a daily political programme broadcast live weekdays on BBC Two at 12:15 pm during parliamentary sessions and presented by Andrew Neil and Jo Coburn. Politics Live discusses the latest political guests and talk about the day events across the United Kingdom, and is repeated on BBC Parliament every night at midnight. The Sunday Politics from BBC One (including the London region opt-out section) is also repeated at midnight on the day of broadcast.
Prime Minister's Questions – recorded coverage of the most recent session of Prime Minister's Questions in the House of Commons. Live coverage is also provided on the channel without comment or interruption as part of the channel's live coverage of the House of Commons' sittings.
 Question Time (repeated from BBC One) – a topical debate programme based on Any Questions? which typically features politicians from at least the three major political parties as well as other public figures who answer questions put to them by the audience. Repeated on BBC Parliament every Sunday at 6 pm.
Scottish First Minister's Questions – recorded coverage of the most recent session of Questions to the First Minister of Scotland in the Scottish Parliament. Scottish First Minister's Questions is broadcast on Thursday evenings at 11:30 pm, and is repeated throughout the week.
 Straight Talk – a weekly political talk show in which presenter Andrew Neil discusses the motivations, ideas and politics of leading figures in UK public life using the 1960s classic Face to Face format. Straight Talk is no longer produced.
 Sunday Politics Scotland  (produced by BBC Scotland) – the Scottish section of The Sunday Politics, presented by Gordon Brewer and transmitted on BBC One Scotland.Ten Minute Rule Bill – Recorded coverage of a backbench MP seeking the leave of the House of Commons to introduce a piece of legislation on a specific topic under the rules of Standing Order 23.
 The Day in Parliament – nightly programme, broadcast at 11 pm, or following the adjournment of the House of Commons if it sits after that time, that rounds up the day's headlines from across all of the UK's legislative chambers. The Record is usually presented by Keith McDougall, Alicia McCarthy, David Cornock, Mandy Baker or Kristina Cooper.
 The Record Europe – a weekly review of the work of the European Parliament, and the other European Union institutions, with debate and analysis of current European political issues. Presented by Shirin Wheeler. Ended mid-2012 and replaced by Politics Europe, presented by Andrew Neil.
 The Week in Parliament – a weekly 30-minute-long analysis and discussion of major events in the UK's legislative chambers. Special editions of the record are produced during Westminster recesses reviewing the preceding session, and at the end of the calendar year reviewing the previous 12 months. The weekly edition is presented by either Keith McDougall, David Cornock, Mandy Baker, Kristina Cooper and Alicia McCarthy, and the special editions are often presented jointly by McDougall and McCarthy.
 The World Debate – part of a selection of programmes originally transmitted on BBC World News, that are broadcast exclusively on BBC Parliament to UK audiences, such as the 2009 London Intelligence Squared debates.
 This Week – repeated from BBC One and presented by Andrew Neil. An often-witty look at developments on the UK and international political scene, with a variety of guest contributions and discussions. The programme ended in July 2019.
 Washington Journal (from C-SPAN) – providing a lookback at the week in American politics, and providing the opportunity for UK viewers to contribute to a phone-in debate.
Welsh First Minister's Questions – recorded coverage of the most recent session of Questions to the First Minister of Wales in the Senedd Cymru – Welsh Parliament. Welsh First Minister's Questions is always broadcast on Tuesday evenings at 11:30 pm, and is then repeated throughout the week.

Until 2019, BBC Parliament also broadcast the annual party conferences of the UK's major political parties in full and highlights of the smaller party conferences. In the past, the channel also aired highlights of the General Synod of the Church of England, live coverage of the annual chamber sitting of the UK Youth Parliament in the House of Commons, oral evidence sessions from the British Youth Council's Youth Select Committee, and the annual House of Lords Chamber Event.

See also 

 Legislative broadcaster

Notes

References

External links 

1992 establishments in the United Kingdom
BBC television channels in the United Kingdom
BBC News channels
Legislature broadcasters
Parliament of the United Kingdom
Television channels and stations established in 1992
Television channels in the United Kingdom